In Greek mythology, Orthopolis (Ancient Greek: Ὀρθοπόλιδι or Ὀρθόπολιν means "upholding the city") was the 12th king of Sicyon who reigned for 63 years.

Family 
Orthopolis was the son and heir of King Plemnaeus, descendant of the city's founder Apis. He was the father of Chrysorthe, mother by Apollo of Coronus, the successor to the Sicyonian throne.

Mythology 
Before Orthopolis was born, all the children borne to his father Plemnaeus by his mother died the very first time they cried. Later on, the goddess Demeter who took pity on the unfortunate king came to Aegialea (ancient name of Sicyon) in the guise of a strange woman and reared for him his son Orthopolis.

In some account of the myth, the crown of Sicyon was passed to Marathonius instead of Coronus.

Notes

References 

 Pausanias, Description of Greece with an English Translation by W.H.S. Jones, Litt.D., and H.A. Ormerod, M.A., in 4 Volumes. Cambridge, MA, Harvard University Press; London, William Heinemann Ltd. 1918. . Online version at the Perseus Digital Library
 Pausanias, Graeciae Descriptio. 3 vols. Leipzig, Teubner. 1903. Greek text available at the Perseus Digital Library.

Princes in Greek mythology
Mythological kings of Sicyon
Kings in Greek mythology
Sicyonian characters in Greek mythology
Deeds of Demeter